Schultzidia is a genus of eels in the snake eel family Ophichthidae. The name of this genus honors American ichthyologist Leonard Peter Schultz (1901-1986), one of the describers of the type species, Muraenichthys johnstonensis. It currently contains the following species:

 Schultzidia johnstonensis (L. P. Schultz & Woods, 1949) (Johnston snake-eel)
 Schultzidia retropinnis (Fowler, 1934) (fringe-lipped worm-eel)

References

Ophichthidae